The 1978 NCAA Division I-AA Football Championship Game was a postseason college football game between the Florida A&M Rattlers and the UMass Minutemen. The game was played on December 16, 1978, at Memorial Stadium in Wichita Falls, Texas. The culminating game of the 1978 NCAA Division I-AA football season, it was won by Florida A&M, 35–28.

This was the first season of I-AA play, and the first championship game for the newly formed division. The game was also known as the Pioneer Bowl, a name that had been used starting in 1971 for various NCAA playoff games held in Wichita Falls.

Teams
The participants of the Championship Game were the finalists of the 1978 I-AA Playoffs, which began with a four-team bracket.

Florida A&M Rattlers

In 1978, Florida A&M was a member of the Southern Intercollegiate Athletic Conference (SIAC), a Division II conference. The university had successfully petitioned the NCAA for Division I classification (Division I-AA in football), which took effect on September 1, 1978.

Florida A&M finished their regular season with a 9–1 record; their only loss was to Tennessee State. Ranked third in the final AP Poll for I-AA, and then having defeated Grambling State in the Orange Blossom Classic played on December 2, the Rattlers were the at-large selection to the four-team playoff. They defeated Jackson State, the South selection, by a score of 15–10 to reach the final.

UMass Minutemen

UMass finished their regular season with an 8–3 record (5–0 in conference)—all of their losses were to Division I-A programs; Villanova, Harvard, and Rutgers. Tied with Western Kentucky for fourth in the final AP Poll for I-AA, the Minutemen were the East selection to the playoff. They defeated Nevada, the West selection, by a 44–21 score to reach the final.

Game summary
It was a factor, especially with Florida A&M, as Sammy Knight punted six times for only 45 total yards; he also had two punts blocked. UMass led early, going ahead 6–0 on two field goals. Florida A&M held a 14–6 lead at halftime, but trailed twice in the second half, as UMass had leads of 15–14 and 22–21. Two fourth quarter touchdowns by fullback Mike Solomon then provided Florida A&M with the winning margin. Florida A&M won without completing a pass from scrimmage, as quarterback Albert Chester went 0-for-7 with two interceptions; he did successfully pass for a two-point conversion, and ran for two touchdowns.

Florida A&M placekicker Vince Coleman, who was 3-for-3 on extra points, would go on to play 13 seasons in Major League Baseball, most notably with the St. Louis Cardinals.

Note: contemporary news reports listed attendance as 14,000 (estimated); NCAA records indicate 13,604.

Scoring summary

Game statistics

See also
 1978 NCAA Division I-AA football rankings

References

Further reading

Championship Game
NCAA Division I Football Championship Games
Florida A&M Rattlers football games
UMass Minutemen football games
American football competitions in Texas
Sports in Wichita Falls, Texas
NCAA Division I-AA Football Championship Game
NCAA Division I-AA Football Championship Game